Gerald Hay (born 9 October 1946 in Canada) is a former Australian weightlifter. He competed for Australia at the 1964 Summer Olympics.

External links
 

1946 births
Australian people of Canadian descent
Australian male weightlifters
Canadian male weightlifters
Weightlifters at the 1964 Summer Olympics
Olympic weightlifters of Australia
Living people
Commonwealth Games medallists in weightlifting
Commonwealth Games silver medallists for Australia
Weightlifters at the 1974 British Commonwealth Games
20th-century Australian people
21st-century Australian people
Medallists at the 1974 British Commonwealth Games